David Wilkins may refer to:
 David H. Wilkins (born 1946), American politician and ambassador
 David Wilkins (sailor) (born 1950), Irish sailor
 David Wilkins (orientalist) (1685–1745), Prussian orientalist
 David B. Wilkins, American law professor
 David E. Wilkins, Lumbee political scientist and scholar of Native politics
 Dave Wilkins (1914–1990), jazz trumpeter from Barbados